Fernando López Arias (August 8, 1905 – July 3, 1978) was a Mexican politician and governor of Veracruz.

1905 births
Governors of Veracruz
Attorneys general of Mexico
Institutional Revolutionary Party politicians
1978 deaths
Politicians from Veracruz